The necklace sprite or necklace pipistrelle (Thainycteris torquatus) is a species of vesper bat that is endemic to Taiwan.

References

Thainycteris
Mammals described in 1999
Bats of Asia
Taxonomy articles created by Polbot
Taxobox binomials not recognized by IUCN